The 2016–17 ISU Short Track Speed Skating World Cup was a multi-race tournament over a season for short track speed skating. The season began on 5 November 2016 in Canada and ended on 10 February 2017. The World Cup was organised by the ISU who also ran world cups and championships in speed skating and figure skating.

Calendar

Men

Calgary 4–6 November 2016

Salt Lake City 11–13 November 2016

Shanghai 9–11 December 2016

Gangneung 16–18 December 2016

Dresden 3–5 February 2017

Minsk 10–12 February 2017

Women

Calgary 4–6 November 2016

Salt Lake City 11–13 November 2016

Shanghai 9–11 December 2016

Gangneung 16–18 December 2016

Dresden 3–5 February 2017

Minsk 10–12 February 2017

World Cup standings

Medal table 

After Dresden

See also
 2017 World Short Track Speed Skating Championships

Notes

References

External links 
 ISU.org World Cup Schedule
 Official results

ISU Short Track Speed Skating World Cup
Isu Short Track Speed Skating World Cup, 2016-17
Isu Short Track Speed Skating World Cup, 2016-17
Short track speed